Emilio Heydrich Martínez (Cuba 1861 – Barcelona 1947), was a German-Cuban merchant, entrepreneur and landowner, son of Fernando Heydrich Klein and María-Candelaria Martínez y Valdés. Heydrich was married to Antonia Cubero y Casals and their daughter Aida Heydrich was married to the President of the Manufacturers of Cigars and Cigarettes of Cuba, Theodore Garbade.

Industry 
In 1923, he founded the company Colores Hispania S.A. for the supplies of painting products. 1927 he began to produce his own chemical products and supplies and, for which he created his new factory halls in Poblenou in Barcelona.

Like most of the factories in Barcelona, his company was confiscated by his workers during the Spanish Civil War, nevertheless he forgave the workers after the war, and continued the company with the same employees until his death in 1947. The company existed until 2000. The factory area with the historical facades was purchased in 1960 by the textile company Miro, and is under historic protection by the Catalan Government.

Historical buildings 
His factory of Colores Hispania SA in Calle Pere lV, number 482, in Poblenou, Barcelona, is a perfect example of industrial architecture of the early 20th century. Architect Josep Graner succeeded in giving the facade a particularly worthy character. It still exists today and is declared a historical place of interest.

Emilio Heydrich y Martínez lived in Calle Iradier, in the district Sarrià-Sant Gervasi, Barcelona. His is one of the first buildings of the architect Joaquim Lloret i Homs, who built several palaces in this district, but was mainly known for the rationalistic building of the Barraquer Ophthalmology Center in Barcelona (1934–1939). Heydrich's house, La Torre de San Fernando, is one of the important classicist palaces in the neighborhood of Sarria-Gervasi.  Since 1960 it hosts the District Police Station, the Comisaria de los Mossos de Escuadra.

In Lloret de Mar, he built the Casa Aida  in 1921. As many Spanish Cubans who returned to Spain he built his house in the style of .The architect Jose Gallart created a cube-shaped single-family house, which until 2006 remained the property of the family. His last owner was Heydrich's great-grandson, the artist Daniel Garbade.

Literature 

 William Jared Clark: Commercial Cuba: a book for business men, Editor: C. Scribner's Sons, 1898
 Elihu Root: Elihu Root collection of United States documents, Editor, Govt. Prtg. Off. EEUU
 Revista, Sociedad Astronómica de España y América, Volúmenes 1–4, 1911
 Receipts and Expenditures in Cuba from Jan. 1, 1899, to Apr. 30, 1900, United States. Congress. Senate. Committee on Relations with Cuba, 1900
 Guía social de La Habana, 1954
 Antonio Santamaría García :Economía y colonia: la economía cubana y la relación con España (1765–1902) CSICI, 2004

References 

1861 births
1947 deaths
19th-century industrialists
20th-century industrialists
19th-century Cuban people